RaceTrac, Inc. is an American corporation that operates a chain of gasoline service stations across the Southern United States. The firm is Georgia's third largest private company, with sales of $9.1 billion in 2013.

History
The company was founded by Carl Bolch Sr. in 1934 in St. Louis, Missouri, with his first stores operating under the name Carl Bolch Trackside Stations. In 1959, Bolch relocated and acquired the Oil Well Company of Opp, Alabama, which consisted of numerous independent outlets across rural Alabama.

His son, Carl Bolch Jr., who succeeded his father as chief executive, joined the company in Montgomery, Alabama in 1967. After pioneering the concept of self-service gasoline in Alabama, Florida, and Georgia, the company relocated its headquarters in 1976 to Atlanta, Georgia. In 1979, all company-operated stores adopted the brand, "RaceTrac", and the "RaceWay" brand is born for all contractor-operated stores.

In the 1990s RaceTrac operated as a cash-only business, but now accepts credit cards, debit cards and fleet cards.

In 1996, RaceTrac founded MetroPlex Energy, a wholly-owned subsidiary of RaceTrac, Inc. and a wholesale fuel supplying company that secures bulk fuel to supply RaceTrac and RaceWay stores and other third-party companies.

In October 2012, Carl Bolch Jr. announced he would be passing the CEO title to his daughter, Allison Bolch Moran, while remaining chairman of the board. The change went into effect December 31, 2012.  In February 2019, Max McBrayer became CEO of RaceTrac and Natalie Bolch Morhous became President of RaceTrac.

On April 5, 2021, employee tax and financial records, and email addresses and first names of some of the RaceTrac Rewards Loyalty users were illegally accessed and posted to the victim shaming site for the Clop ransomware gang.

Locations

RaceTrac, Inc. operates more than 550 retail gasoline convenience stores in 12 southeastern states under the RaceTrac (company-operated) and RaceWay (Contract Operator-operated) names. Most RaceTracs feature 20 to 24 fueling positions and a 5000+ sq. ft. convenience store offering over 4,000 items. In January 2012, RaceTrac introduced its new 6,000 square foot store design, the RT6K, which features Swirl World frozen yogurt, free Wi-Fi internet and indoor and outdoor seating.

RaceTrac can be found in Alabama, Florida, Georgia, Kentucky, Louisiana, Tennessee, Texas, and Mississippi. There are over 200 RaceWay-branded locations in Alabama, Arkansas, Florida, Georgia, Louisiana, Mississippi, North Carolina, South Carolina, Tennessee, Texas, and Virginia.

Awards and Acknowledgments

The company has been ranked on Forbes magazine's list of largest private companies every year since 1998. 

In October 2009, Carl Bolch Jr, executive chairman and CEO of RaceTrac at the time, was named by Convenience Store News as their 2009 Retailer of the Year for "pioneering forecourt retailing in the Southeast and making an indelible mark on the convenience industry overall". Bolch remains executive chairman of the RaceTrac board.

In 2017, RaceTrac was named Cold & Frozen Beverages Innovator of the Year by Convenience Store News. 

In 2022, USA Today 10Best Awards: Convenience Stores - awarded RaceTrac with 9th Place. 

In 2023, RaceTrac was listed in the In Good Company Report – a list of companies that demonstrate a commitment to business generosity in a variety of ways. 

In 2023, Natalie Morhous, President of RaceTrac, Inc. was named Retail Leader of the Year by CSP.

Programs and Partnerships 
Since 2011, RaceTrac has raised more than $6 million for The Michael J. Fox Foundation for Parkinson's Research through their annual Run For Research 5K Race and store-level fundraising efforts. 

As a part of the RaceTrac Gives Back initiative, each year in April during Parkinson's Awareness Month RaceTrac guests have had the option to add $1 to their purchases and/or buy a $1 candy bar. During one week in April, all coffee proceeds are donated directly to the cause. 

Additionally, RaceTrac holds the RaceTrac’s Run for Research 5K Race event in Atlanta each year to raise funds for the Foundation. RaceTrac’s Run for Research takes place at Truist Park, home of RaceTrac’s partner: the Atlanta Braves. 

Since 2010, RaceTrac has partnered with Camp Sunshine, an organization in Georgia committed to enriching the lives of children with cancer and their families through recreational, educational and support programs. RaceTrac has raised more than $1 million to date for Camp Sunshine. 

RaceTrac launched the RaceTrac Gives Back employee volunteer program at their Store Support Center headquartered in Atlanta, GA in 2017. After participating in a survey to learn what efforts are most meaningful to guests, they decided that the program would support homelessness and poverty-related causes primarily within Cobb County where the RaceTrac corporate office is located. 

RaceTrac has been a partner of the Atlanta Braves since 2014 and is a proud owner of the RaceTrac Beat the Freeze race. 

RaceTrac supports first responders by offering free coffee or fountain drinks at all locations on a daily basis.

References

External links
 Company website

Companies based in Atlanta
Privately held companies based in Georgia (U.S. state)
Privately held companies of the United States
Economy of the Southeastern United States
Convenience stores of the United States
Retail companies established in 1934
Gas stations in the United States
1934 establishments in Missouri
Companies based in Cobb County, Georgia